"I'm Fakin" is a song by American singer Sabrina Carpenter from her fourth studio album Singular: Act II (2019), which served as the fourth track of the album. The track was written by Carpenter, Jackson Morgan, Katie Pearlman and the songs producers Mauricio Rengifo and Andrés Torres. Hollywood Records released the song on July 12, 2019 as Singular: Act II's first promotional single, a week before the album's release. With tropical house and pop influences, it is a tropical song which lyrics discuss the ups and downs of a relationship.

Release 
During Carpenter's performance on Good Morning America's Summer Concert Series on July 5, 2019, concert-goers were airdropped a clip of the song and a message saying it would be released on July 12, 2019. Hollywood Records nor Carpenter confirmed or denied this until July 11, 2019. The song was released that night.

Critical reception 
Mike Neid of Idolator said it is "one of the catchiest songs we've heard from the project yet" and that it is an "irresistible and relatable bop".

Personnel 
Credits adapted from Tidal.

 Sabrina Carpenter - vocals, songwriting
 Jackson Morgan - songwriting
 Katie Pearlman - songwriting
 Mauricio Rengifo - production, songwriting, programming, arrangement, engineering, studio personnel, synthesizer
 Andrés Torres - production, songwriting, electric guitar, programming, arrangement, engineering, studio personnel, synthesizer
 Tim Watt - assistant recording engineer, studio personnel
 Will Quinnell - assistant recording engineer, studio personnel
 Eric J Dubowsky - mixing, studio personnel

Release history

References

Sabrina Carpenter songs
2019 songs
Songs written by Sabrina Carpenter
Song recordings produced by Andrés Torres (producer)
Songs written by Mauricio Rengifo
Songs written by Andrés Torres (producer)